Enzo Gibelli (born 11 May 2000) is a French judoka.

He won a medal at the 2021 World Judo Championships.

He competed in the men's 73 kg event at the 2022 Mediterranean Games held in Oran, Algeria.

References

External links

2000 births
Living people
French male judoka
Competitors at the 2022 Mediterranean Games
Mediterranean Games competitors for France
21st-century French people